Amalgamation is the process of combining or uniting multiple entities into one form.

Amalgamation, amalgam, and other derivatives may refer to:

Mathematics and science
 Amalgam (chemistry), the combination of mercury with another metal
Pan amalgamation, another extraction method with additional compound
Patio process, the use of mercury amalgamation to extract silver
 Amalgamation (geology), the creation of a stable continent or craton by the union of two terranes; see Tectonic evolution of the Barberton greenstone belt
 Amalgamation paradox in probability and statistics, also known as Simpson's paradox
 Amalgamation property in model theory
 Free product with amalgamation, in mathematics, especially group theory, an important construction

Arts, entertainment, and media
 Amalgamated Broadcasting System, a short-lived American radio network during the 1930s
 Amalgamation (fiction), the concept of creating an element in a work of fiction by combining existing things
 Amalgamation, a 1994 EP by the band Pop Will Eat Itself
 Amalgamation, the debut studio album by the band Trapt

Other uses
 Amalgamated (1917 automobile), car manufactured by the Amalgamated Machinery Corp.
 Amalgamated (organization name)
 Amalgamation (business), the merge or consolidation of companies
 Amalgamation (land), the formal combination of adjoining plots; in some jurisdictions distinct from a merger 
 Amalgamation (names), the strategy of naming something after a combination of existing names
 Amalgamation (race), a now largely archaic term for the merger of people of different ethnicities and "races"
 Amalgamation, another name for a trade union, chiefly used in the UK
 Amalgamation, in C (programming language) (C) and C++ programming, merging all the source codes of a library into a single header file
 Conflation, also known as "idiom amalgamation", the combination of two expressions
 Merger (politics), consolidation or amalgamation, in geopolitics, joining two or more political or administrative entities, such as municipalities, cities, towns, counties, districts etc. into a single entity

See also
 Amalgam (disambiguation)